Pflugerville may refer to:

Pflugerville, Texas, a city in Travis County, Texas, United States
Lake Pflugerville, a reservoir in Pflugerville, Texas
Pflugerville High School, a public high school located in Pflugerville, Texas 
Pflugerville Independent School District (PfISD), a public school district based in Pflugerville, Texas
Pflugerville Solar Farm, proposed solar photovoltaic power plant near Pflugerville, Texas

See also
Pflüger
Pflueger